Brigitte Wokoeck (born 22 February 1946) is a former pair skater who represented East Germany and the United Team of Germany in competition. With partner Heinz-Ulrich Walther, she is the 1963 Blue Swords champion and a two-time East German national champion (1962, 1964). The pair competed at the 1964 Winter Olympics, finishing 11th.

Competitive highlights 
(with Walther)

References

 

1946 births
Living people
Sportspeople from Lübeck
German female pair skaters
Figure skaters at the 1964 Winter Olympics
Olympic figure skaters of the United Team of Germany